Spaan or van Spaan is a Dutch surname. Notable people with the surname include:
Edith Hemaspaandra (née Spaan), Dutch-American theoretical computer scientist
Gerrit van Spaan (1654–1711), Dutch writer
Hans Spaan (born 1958), Dutch motorcycle racer
Henk Spaan (born 1948), Dutch sports journalist
Johannie Maria Spaan, South African wildlife biologist
Machiel Spaan (born 1966), Dutch architect

See also
Jeroen Spaans (born 1973), Dutch rower

Dutch-language surnames